The following people were born or based their life in Tiruchirappalli, earlier known as Trichinopoly.

Arts

Actor 
Alex, Tamil film actor and magician
S. A. Ashokan, Tamil film actor
M. K. Thyagaraja Bhagavathar, Tamil film actor
Bharath, Indian film actor
Napoleon, Indian film actor
Sivakarthikeyan, Tamil film actor
Prasanna, Indian film actor
Kaka Radhakrishnan, Tamil film actor
Kavin, Tamil television actor and Bigg Boss Tamil 3 contestant

Actress 
Anu Hasan, actress and television host
Vanitha Krishnachandran, South Indian film actress
T. A. Madhuram, Tamil film actress
Renuka, Indian film actress
Yuvarani, Tamil film actress

Director 
 Akilan, Indian film director and producer
 Balaji Mohan, Tamil film director

Others 
Vanitha Rangaraju, animator, Industrial Light & Magic
Javar Seetharaman, Tamil writer, playwright and Tamil film actor
Gunasekaran Sundarraj, miniature artist, social worker

Music

Composer 
James Vasanthan, Tamil film composer
Santhosh Narayanan, Tamil film composer
T. K. Ramamoorthy, Indian film composer
G. Ramanathan, Indian film composer

Singer 

 Thiruchi Loganathan, Tamil playback singer
Lalgudi Jayaraman, Violinist.
Srirangam Kannan, carnatic musician
Krish, Indian playback singer
P. Madhuri, Indian playback singer
T. L. Maharajan, Tamil playback singer
Roshini, Indian playback singer
A. K. C. Natarajan, carnatic musician
Musiri Subramania Iyer, carnatic musician

Lyricist 
Vaali, Tamil film lyricist, screenwriter

Literature 
V. V. S. Aiyar, Indian independence activist, Tamil writer
Madhan, cartoonist, journalist, writer and film critic
Manushyaputhiran (S. Abdul Hameed), poet, writer, lyricist, publisher
Samuel Vedanayagam Pillai, Tamil poet, novelist and social worker
Sujatha, Tamil writer, engineer, novelist, Tamil film screenwriter
Kalki Sadasivam, co-founder of Kalki

Military
Valentine Munbee McMaster, British military personnel, recipient of the Victoria Cross
Mariappan Saravanan, Indian military personnel, recipient of Vir Chakra

Politics and administration 
F. G. Natesa Iyer, Indian National Congress leader from South India, Tamil dramatist
M. R. Sethuratnam Iyer, former Minister of Development in the Madras Presidency
 T. V. Seshagiri Iyer, Indian lawyer and politician 
 Khan Bahadur P. Kalifullah Sahib Rowther, Politician and Dewan of Pudukkottai State from 1941 to 1947
T. S. S. Rajan, Indian independence activist, Minister of Public Health and Religious Endowments in the Madras Presidency from 1937 to 1939
K. Subrahmanyam, former strategic affairs analyst of India and journalist
P. Rathinavelu Thevar, Chairperson of the Trichinopoly Municipality from 1924 to 1946 and former vice-president of the Justice Party
 K. A. P. Viswanatham, Tamil scholar, activist and General secretary of Justice Party until 1940

Science 
N. Mathrubootham, medical practitioner, counselor and psychiatrist
C. V. Raman, Nobel laureate in Physics and Bharat Ratna recipient
M.A.Aleem Neurologist and first Emeritus Professor in Neurology from Trichy

Sports 
Arokia Rajiv, Track and field athlete specialised in 400 metres.
Charles Cornelius, former Indian hockey team goalkeeper and Olympic medallist
Francis Monkland, former English first-class cricketer
Francis Wyatt, former English first-class cricketer
Leslie Fernandez, former Indian hockey team goalkeeper
Rajagopal Sathish, Indian first-class all rounder, captain of Indian World Team in the former Indian Cricket League Twenty20 competition.

See also 
Lists of people from India by state

References

 
Tiruchirappalli
Tiruchirappalli
Tiruchirappalli-related lists